Readily visible alterations of the skin surface have been recognized since the dawn of history, with some being treated, and some not. One of the earliest known sources documenting skin ailments is the Ebers Papyrus, a medical document from ancient Egypt dating to around 1500 BC. It describes various skin diseases, including ulcers, rashes, and tumors, and prescribes surgery and ointments to treat the ailments.

In 1572, Geronimo Mercuriali of Forlì, Italy, completed De morbis cutaneis (translated "On the diseases of the skin"), and is known as the first scientific work to be dedicated to dermatology.  One source lists Jean Astruc (1684-1766) as the founder of modern dermatology. In 1799, Francesco Bianchi wrote the book Dermatologia which is the first comprehensive textbook of modern dermatology written for the students of medicine.

In 1801 the first great school of dermatology became a reality at the famous Hôpital Saint-Louis in Paris, while the first textbooks (Willan's, 1798–1808) and atlases (Alibert's, 1806–1814) appeared in print during the same period of time.

See also 
 Vienna School of Dermatology
 List of dermatologists
List of cutaneous conditions

Notes

References

External links 
 History of Dermatology Society
 French Society for the History of Dermatology
 American Association for the History of Medicine
 The Canadian Society for the History of Medicine

Dermatology